January 1 or 1 January is the first day of the year in the Gregorian Calendar. There are 364 days remaining until the end of the year (365 in leap years). This day is also known as New Year's Day since the day marks the beginning of the year. 

Events

Pre-1600
153 BC – For the first time, Roman consuls begin their year in office on January 1.
45 BC – The Julian calendar takes effect as the civil calendar of the Roman Empire, establishing January 1 as the new date of the new year.
42 BC – The Roman Senate posthumously deifies Julius Caesar.
 193 – The Senate chooses Pertinax against his will to succeed Commodus as Roman emperor.
404 – Saint Telemachus tries to stop a gladiatorial fight in a Roman amphitheatre, and is stoned to death by the crowd. This act impresses the Christian Emperor Honorius, who issues a historic ban on gladiatorial fights.
 417 – Emperor Honorius forces Galla Placidia into marriage to Constantius, his famous general (magister militum) (probable).
 947 – Emperor Tai Zong of the Khitan-led Liao Dynasty captures Daliang, ending the dynasty and empire of the Later Jin.
1001 – Grand Prince Stephen I of Hungary is named the first King of Hungary by Pope Sylvester II (probable).
1068 – Romanos IV Diogenes marries Eudokia Makrembolitissa and is crowned Byzantine Emperor.
1259 – Michael VIII Palaiologos is proclaimed co-emperor of the Empire of Nicaea with his ward John IV Laskaris.
1438 – Albert II of Habsburg is crowned King of Hungary.
1500 – Portuguese explorer Pedro Álvares Cabral discovers the coast of Brazil. 
1502 – The present-day location of Rio de Janeiro, Brazil, is first explored by the Portuguese.
1515 – Twenty-year-old Francis, Duke of Brittany, succeeds to the French throne following the death of his father-in-law, Louis XII.
1527 – Croatian nobles elect Ferdinand I, Archduke of Austria as King of Croatia in the 1527 election in Cetin.
1600 – Scotland recognises January 1 as the start of the year, instead of March 25.

1601–1900
1604 – The Masque of Indian and China Knights is performed by courtiers of James VI and I at Hampton Court.
1651 – Charles II is crowned King of Scotland at Scone Palace.
1700 – Russia begins using the Anno Domini era instead of the Anno Mundi era of the Byzantine Empire.
1707 – John V is proclaimed King of Portugal and the Algarves in Lisbon.
1739 – Bouvet Island, the world's remotest island, is discovered by French explorer Jean-Baptiste Charles Bouvet de Lozier.
1772 – The first traveler's cheques, which could be used in 90 European cities, are issued by the London Credit Exchange Company.
1773 – The hymn that became known as "Amazing Grace", then titled "1 Chronicles 17:16–17, Faith's Review and Expectation", is first used to accompany a sermon led by John Newton in the town of Olney, Buckinghamshire, England.
1776 – American Revolutionary War: Norfolk, Virginia is burned by combined Royal Navy and Continental Army action.
  1776   – General George Washington hoists the first United States flag, the Grand Union Flag, at Prospect Hill.
1781 – American Revolutionary War: One thousand five hundred soldiers of the 6th Pennsylvania Regiment under General Anthony Wayne's command rebel against the Continental Army's winter camp in Morristown, New Jersey in the Pennsylvania Line Mutiny of 1781.
1788 – The first edition of The Times of London, previously The Daily Universal Register, is published.
1801 – The legislative union of Kingdom of Great Britain and Kingdom of Ireland is completed, and the United Kingdom of Great Britain and Ireland is proclaimed.
  1801   – Ceres, the largest and first known object in the Asteroid belt, is discovered by Giuseppe Piazzi.
1804 – French rule ends in Haiti. Haiti becomes the first black-majority republic and second independent country in North America after the United States.
1806 – The French Republican Calendar is abolished.
1808 – The United States bans the importation of slaves.
1810 – Major-General Lachlan Macquarie officially becomes Governor of New South Wales. 
1822 – The Greek Constitution of 1822 is adopted by the First National Assembly at Epidaurus.
1834 – Most of Germany forms the Zollverein customs union, the first such union between sovereign states.
1847 – The world's first "Mercy" Hospital is founded in Pittsburgh, United States, by a group of Sisters of Mercy from Ireland; the name will go on to grace over 30 major hospitals throughout the world.
1860 – The first Polish stamp is issued, replacing the Russian stamps previously in use.
1861 – Liberal forces supporting Benito Juárez enter Mexico City.
1863 – American Civil War: The Emancipation Proclamation takes effect in Confederate territory.
1877 – Queen Victoria of the United Kingdom is proclaimed Empress of India.
1885 – Twenty-five nations adopt Sandford Fleming's proposal for standard time (and also, time zones).
1890 – Eritrea is consolidated into a colony by the Italian government.
1892 – Ellis Island begins processing immigrants into the United States.
1898 – New York, New York annexes land from surrounding counties, creating the City of Greater New York. The four initial boroughs, Manhattan, Brooklyn, Queens, and The Bronx, are joined on January 25 by Staten Island to create the modern city of five boroughs.
1899 – Spanish rule ends in Cuba.
1900 – Nigeria becomes British protectorate with Frederick Lugard as high commissioner.

1901–present
1901 – The Southern Nigeria Protectorate is established within the British Empire.
  1901   – The British colonies of New South Wales, Queensland, Victoria, South Australia, Tasmania, and Western Australia federate as the Commonwealth of Australia; Edmund Barton is appointed the first Prime Minister.
1902 – The first American college football bowl game, the Rose Bowl between Michigan and Stanford, is held in Pasadena, California.
1910 – Captain David Beatty is promoted to Rear admiral, and becomes the youngest admiral in the Royal Navy (except for Royal family members) since Horatio Nelson.
1912 – The Republic of China is established.
1914 – The SPT Airboat Line becomes the world's first scheduled airline to use a winged aircraft.
1923 – Britain's Railways are grouped into the Big Four: LNER, GWR, SR, and LMS.
1927 – A new Mexican oil legislation goes into effect, leading to the formal outbreak of the Cristero War.
1928 – Boris Bazhanov defects through Iran. He is the only assistant of Joseph Stalin's secretariat to have defected from the Eastern Bloc.
1929 – The former municipalities of Point Grey, British Columbia and South Vancouver, British Columbia are amalgamated into Vancouver.
1932 – The United States Post Office Department issues a set of 12 stamps commemorating the 200th anniversary of George Washington's birth.
1934 – Alcatraz Island in San Francisco Bay becomes a United States federal prison.
  1934   – A "Law for the Prevention of Genetically Diseased Offspring" comes into effect in Nazi Germany.
1942 – The Declaration by United Nations is signed by twenty-six nations.
1945 – World War II: The German Luftwaffe launches Operation Bodenplatte, a massive, but failed, attempt to knock out Allied air power in northern Europe in a single blow.
1947 – Cold War: The American and British occupation zones in Allied-occupied Germany, after World War II, merge to form the Bizone, which later (with the French zone) became part of West Germany.
  1947   – The Canadian Citizenship Act 1946 comes into effect, converting British subjects into Canadian citizens. Prime Minister William Lyon Mackenzie King becomes the first Canadian citizen.
1948 – The British railway network is nationalized to form British Railways.
1949 – United Nations cease-fire takes effect in Kashmir from one minute before midnight. War between India and Pakistan stops accordingly.
1956 – Sudan achieves independence from Egypt and the United Kingdom.
1957 – George Town, Penang, is made a city by a royal charter of Queen Elizabeth II of the United Kingdom.
  1957   – Lèse majesté in Thailand is strengthened to include "insult" and changed to a crime against national security, after the Thai criminal code of 1956 went into effect.
1958 – The European Economic Community is established.
1959 – Cuban Revolution: Fulgencio Batista, dictator of Cuba, is overthrown by Fidel Castro's forces.
1960 – Cameroon achieves independence from France and the United Kingdom.
1962 – Western Samoa achieves independence from New Zealand; its name is changed to the Independent State of Western Samoa.
1964 – The Federation of Rhodesia and Nyasaland is divided into the independent republics of Zambia and Malawi, and the British-controlled Rhodesia.
1965 – The People's Democratic Party of Afghanistan is founded in Kabul, Afghanistan.
1970 – The defined beginning of Unix time, at 00:00:00.
1971 – Cigarette advertisements are banned on American television.
1973 – Denmark, Ireland and the United Kingdom are admitted into the European Economic Community.
1976 – A bomb explodes on board Middle East Airlines Flight 438 over Qaisumah, Saudi Arabia, killing all 81 people on board.
1978 – Air India Flight 855, a Boeing 747, crashes into the Arabian Sea off the coast of Bombay, India, due to instrument failure, spatial disorientation, and pilot error, killing all 213 people on board.
1979 – Normal diplomatic relations are established between the People's Republic of China and the United States.
1981 – Greece is admitted into the European Community.
1982 – Peruvian Javier Pérez de Cuéllar becomes the first Latin American to hold the title of Secretary-General of the United Nations.
1983 – The ARPANET officially changes to using TCP/IP, the Internet Protocol, effectively creating the Internet.
1984 – The original American Telephone & Telegraph Company is divested of its 22 Bell System companies as a result of the settlement of the 1974 United States Department of Justice antitrust suit against AT&T.
  1984   – Brunei becomes independent of the United Kingdom.
1985 – The first British mobile phone call is made by Michael Harrison to his father Sir Ernest Harrison, chairman of Vodafone.
1987 – The Isleta Pueblo tribe elect Verna Williamson to be their first female governor.
1988 – The Evangelical Lutheran Church in America comes into existence, creating the largest Lutheran denomination in the United States.
1989 – The Montreal Protocol comes into force, stopping the use of chemicals contributing to ozone depletion.
1990 – David Dinkins is sworn in as New York City's first black mayor.
1993 – Dissolution of Czechoslovakia: Czechoslovakia is divided into the Czech Republic and Slovak Republic.
1994 – The Zapatista Army of National Liberation initiates twelve days of armed conflict in the Mexican state of Chiapas.
  1994   – The North American Free Trade Agreement (NAFTA) comes into effect.
1995 – The World Trade Organization comes into being.
  1995   – The Draupner wave in the North Sea in Norway is detected, confirming the existence of freak waves.
  1995   – Austria, Finland and Sweden join the EU.
1998 – Following a currency reform, Russia begins to circulate new rubles to stem inflation and promote confidence.
 1998 – Argentinian physicist Juan Maldacena published a landmark paper initiating the study of AdS/CFT correspondence, which links string theory and quantum gravity.
1999 – Euro currency is introduced in 11 member nations of the European Union (with the exception of the United Kingdom, Denmark, Greece and Sweden).
2001 – Greece adopts the Euro
2004 – In a vote of confidence, General Pervez Musharraf wins 658 out of 1,170 votes in the Electoral College of Pakistan, and according to Article 41(8) of the Constitution of Pakistan, is "deemed to be elected" to the office of President until October 2007. 
2007 – Bulgaria and Romania join the EU.
  2007   – Adam Air Flight 574 breaks apart in mid-air and crashes near the Makassar Strait, Indonesia, killing all 102 people on board.
2009 – Sixty-six people die in a nightclub fire in Bangkok, Thailand.
2010 – A suicide car bomber detonates at a volleyball tournament in Lakki Marwat, Pakistan, killing 105 and injuring 100 more.
2011 – A bomb explodes as Coptic Christians in Alexandria, Egypt, leave a new year service, killing 23 people.
  2011   – Estonia officially adopts the Euro currency and becomes the 17th Eurozone country.
2013 – At least 60 people are killed and 200 injured in a stampede after celebrations at Félix Houphouët-Boigny Stadium in Abidjan, Ivory Coast.
2015 – The Eurasian Economic Union comes into effect, creating a political and economic union between Russia, Belarus, Armenia, Kazakhstan and Kyrgyzstan.
2017 – An attack on a nightclub in Istanbul, Turkey, during New Year's celebrations, kills at least 39 people and injures more than 60 others.
2023 – Croatia officially adopts the Euro, becoming the 20th Eurozone country, and becomes the 27th member of the Schengen Area.

Births

Pre-1600
 766 – Ali al-Ridha (d. 818) 8th Imam of Twelver Shia Islam
1431 – Pope Alexander VI (d. 1503)
1449 – Lorenzo de' Medici, Italian politician (d. 1492)
1467 – Sigismund I the Old, Polish king (d. 1548)
1484 – Huldrych Zwingli, Swiss pastor and theologian (d. 1531)
1511 – Henry, Duke of Cornwall, first-born child of Henry VIII of England (d. 1511)
1557 – Stephen Bocskay, Prince of Transylvania (d. 1606)
1600 – Friedrich Spanheim, Dutch theologian and academic (d. 1649)

1601–1900
1628 – Christoph Bernhard, German composer and theorist (d. 1692)
1655 – Christian Thomasius, German jurist and philosopher (d. 1728)
1684 – Arnold Drakenborch, Dutch scholar and author (d. 1748)
1704 – Soame Jenyns, English author, poet, and politician (d. 1787)
1711 – Baron Franz von der Trenck, Austrian soldier (d. 1749)
1714 – Giovanni Battista Mancini, Italian soprano and author (d. 1800)
  1714   – Kristijonas Donelaitis, Lithuanian pastor and poet (d. 1780)
1735 – Paul Revere, American silversmith and engraver (d. 1818)
1745 – Anthony Wayne, American general and politician (d. 1796)
1752 – Betsy Ross, American seamstress, sewed flags for the Pennsylvania Navy during the Revolutionary War (d. 1836)
1768 – Maria Edgeworth, Anglo-Irish author (d. 1849)
1769 – Marie-Louise Lachapelle, French obstetrician (d. 1821)
1774 – André Marie Constant Duméril, French zoologist and academic (d. 1860)
1779 – William Clowes, English publisher (d. 1847)
1803 – Edward Dickinson, American politician and father of poet Emily Dickinson (d. 1874)
1806 – Lionel Kieseritzky, Estonian-French chess player (d. 1853)
1809 – Achille Guenée, French lawyer and entomologist (d. 1880)
1813 – George Bliss, American politician (d. 1868)
1814 – Hong Xiuquan, Chinese rebellion leader and king (d. 1864)
1818 – William Gamble, Irish-born American general (d. 1866)
1819 – Arthur Hugh Clough, English-Italian poet and academic (d. 1861)
  1819   – George Foster Shepley, American general (d. 1878)
1823 – Sándor Petőfi, Hungarian poet and activist (d. 1849)
1833 – Robert Lawson, Scottish-New Zealand architect, designed the Otago Boys' High School and Knox Church (d. 1902)
1834 – Ludovic Halévy, French author and playwright (d. 1908)
1839 – Ouida, English-Italian author and activist (d. 1908)
1848 – John W. Goff, Irish-American lawyer and politician (d. 1924)
1852 – Eugène-Anatole Demarçay, French chemist and academic (d. 1904)
1854 – James George Frazer, Scottish anthropologist and academic (d. 1941)
  1854   – Thomas Waddell, Irish-Australian politician, 15th Premier of New South Wales (d. 1940)
1857 – Tim Keefe, American baseball player (d. 1933)
1858 – Heinrich Rauchinger, Kraków-born painter (d. 1942)
1859 – Michael Joseph Owens, American inventor (d. 1923)
  1859   – Thibaw Min, Burmese king (d. 1916)
1860 – Michele Lega, Italian cardinal (d. 1935)
1863 – Pierre de Coubertin, French historian and educator, founded the International Olympic Committee (d. 1937)
1864 – Alfred Stieglitz, American photographer and curator (d. 1946)
  1864   – Qi Baishi, Chinese painter (d. 1957)
1867 – Mary Acworth Evershed, English astronomer and scholar (d. 1949)
1874 – Frank Knox, American publisher and politician, 46th United States Secretary of the Navy (d. 1944)
  1874   – Gustave Whitehead, German-American pilot and engineer (d. 1927)
1877 – Alexander von Staël-Holstein, German sinologist and orientalist (d. 1937)
1878 – Agner Krarup Erlang, Danish mathematician, statistician, and engineer (d. 1929)
1879 – E. M. Forster, English author and playwright (d. 1970)
  1879   – William Fox, Hungarian-American screenwriter and producer, founded the Fox Film Corporation and Fox Theatres (d. 1952)
1883 – William J. Donovan, American general, lawyer, and politician (d. 1959)
1884 – Chikuhei Nakajima, Japanese lieutenant, engineer, and politician, founded Nakajima Aircraft Company (d. 1949)
1887 – Wilhelm Canaris, German admiral (d. 1945)
1888 – Georgios Stanotas, Greek general (d. 1965)
  1888   – John Garand, Canadian-American engineer, designed the M1 Garand rifle (d. 1974)
1889 – Charles Bickford, American actor (d. 1967)
1890 – Anton Melik, Slovenian geographer and academic (d. 1966)
1891 – Sampurnanand, Indian educator and politician, 3rd Governor of Rajasthan (d. 1969)
1892 – Mahadev Desai, Indian author and activist (d. 1942)
  1892   – Artur Rodziński, Polish-American conductor (d. 1958)
  1892   – Manuel Roxas, Filipino lawyer and politician, 5th President of the Philippines (d. 1948)
1893 – Mordechai Frizis, Greek colonel (d. 1940)
1894 – Satyendra Nath Bose, Indian physicist and mathematician (d. 1974)
  1894   – Edward Joseph Hunkeler, American clergyman (d. 1970)
1895 – J. Edgar Hoover, American law enforcement official; 1st Director of the Federal Bureau of Investigation (d. 1972)
1900 – Chiune Sugihara, Japanese soldier and diplomat (d. 1986)
  1900   – Xavier Cugat, Spanish-American singer-songwriter and actor (d. 1990)

1901–present
1902 – Buster Nupen, Norwegian-South African cricketer and lawyer (d. 1977)
  1902   – Hans von Dohnányi, German jurist and political dissident (d. 1945)
1904 – Fazal Ilahi Chaudhry, Pakistani lawyer and politician, 5th President of Pakistan (d. 1982)
1905 – Stanisław Mazur, Ukrainian-Polish mathematician and theorist (d. 1981)
1906 – Manuel Silos, Filipino filmmaker and actor (d. 1988)
1907 – Kinue Hitomi, Japanese sprinter and long jumper (d. 1931)
1909 – Dana Andrews, American actor (d. 1992)
  1909   – Stepan Bandera, Ukrainian soldier and politician (d. 1959)
1911 – Audrey Wurdemann, American poet and author (d. 1960)
  1911   – Basil Dearden, English director, producer, and screenwriter (d. 1971)
  1911   – Hank Greenberg, American baseball player (d. 1986)
  1911   – Roman Totenberg, Polish-American violinist and educator (d. 2012)
1912 – Boris Vladimirovich Gnedenko, Russian mathematician and historian (d. 1995)
  1912   – Kim Philby, British spy (d. 1988)
  1912   – Nikiforos Vrettakos, Greek poet and academic (d. 1991)
1914 – Noor Inayat Khan, British SOE agent (d. 1944)
1917 – Shannon Bolin, American actress and singer (d. 2016)
1918 – Patrick Anthony Porteous, Scottish colonel, Victoria Cross recipient (d. 2000)
  1918   – Willy den Ouden, Dutch swimmer (d. 1997)
1919 – Rocky Graziano, American boxer and actor (d. 1990)
  1919   – Carole Landis, American actress (d. 1948)
  1919   – Sheila Mercier, British actress, Emmerdale Farm (d. 2019)
  1919   – J. D. Salinger, American soldier and author (d. 2010)
1920 – Osvaldo Cavandoli, Italian cartoonist (d. 2007)
1921 – Ismail al-Faruqi, Palestinian-American philosopher and academic (d. 1986)
  1921   – César Baldaccini, French sculptor and academic (d. 1998)
  1921   – Regina Bianchi, Italian actress (d. 2013)
1922 – Ernest Hollings, American soldier and politician, 106th Governor of South Carolina (d. 2019)
1923 – Valentina Cortese, Italian actress (d. 2019)
  1923   – Milt Jackson, American jazz vibraphonist and composer (d. 1999)
1924 – Francisco Macías Nguema, Equatorial Guinean politician, 1st President of the Republic of Equatorial Guinea (d. 1979)
1925 – Matthew Beard, American child actor (d. 1981)
  1925   – Paul Bomani, Tanzanian politician and diplomat, 1st Tanzanian Minister of Finance (d. 2005)
1926 – Kazys Petkevičius, Lithuanian basketball player and coach (d. 2008)
1927 – Maurice Béjart, French-Swiss dancer, choreographer, and director (d. 2007)
  1927   – James Reeb, American clergyman and political activist (d. 1965)
  1927   – Vernon L. Smith, American economist and academic, Nobel Prize laureate
  1927   – Doak Walker, American football player and businessman (d. 1998)
1928 – Ernest Tidyman, American author and screenwriter (d. 1984)
  1928   – Gerhard Weinberg, German-American historian, author, and academic
1929 – Larry L. King, American journalist, author, and playwright (d. 2012)
1930 – Frederick Wiseman, American director and producer 
1932 – Giuseppe Patanè, Italian conductor (d. 1989)
1933 – James Hormel, American philanthropist and diplomat (d. 2021)
  1933   – Joe Orton, English dramatist (d. 1967)
1934 – Alan Berg, American lawyer and radio host (d. 1984)
  1934   – Lakhdar Brahimi, Algerian politician, Algerian Minister of Foreign Affairs
1935 – Om Prakash Chautala, Indian politician
1936 – James Sinegal, American businessman, co-founded Costco
1938 – Frank Langella, American actor
1939 – Michèle Mercier, French actress
  1939   – Phil Read, English motorcycle racer and businessman
  1939   – Senfronia Thompson, American politician
  1939   – Younoussi Touré, Malian politician, Prime Minister of Mali
1942 – Dennis Archer, American lawyer and politician, 67th Mayor of Detroit
  1942   – Anthony Hamilton-Smith, 3rd Baron Colwyn, English dentist and politician
  1942   – Country Joe McDonald, American singer-songwriter and guitarist
  1942   – Alassane Ouattara, Ivorian economist and politician, President of the Ivory Coast
  1942   – Gennadi Sarafanov, Russian pilot and cosmonaut (d. 2005)
1943 – Don Novello, American comedian, screenwriter and producer
  1943   – Tony Knowles, American soldier and politician, 7th Governor of Alaska
  1943   – Vladimir Šeks, Croatian lawyer and politician, 16th Speaker of the Croatian Parliament
1944 – Omar al-Bashir, Sudanese field marshal and politician, 7th President of Sudan
  1944   – Barry Beath, Australian rugby league player
  1944   – Zafarullah Khan Jamali, Pakistani field hockey player and politician, 13th Prime Minister of Pakistan (d.2020)
  1944   – Teresa Torańska, Polish journalist and author (d. 2013)
  1944   – Mati Unt, Estonian author, playwright, and director (d. 2005)
1945 – Jacky Ickx, Belgian racing driver
  1945   – Victor Ashe, American politician and former United States Ambassador to Poland
1946 – Claude Steele, American social psychologist and academic
  1946   – Rivellino, Brazilian footballer and manager
1947 – Jon Corzine, American sergeant and politician, 54th Governor of New Jersey
1948 – Devlet Bahçeli, Turkish economist, academic, and politician, 57th Deputy Prime Minister of Turkey
  1948   – Dick Quax, New Zealand runner and politician (d. 2018)
  1948   – Pavel Grachev, Russian general and politician, 1st Russian Minister of Defence (d. 2012)
1949 – Borys Tarasyuk, Ukrainian politician and diplomat
1950 – Wayne Bennett, Australian rugby league player and coach
  1950   – Tony Currie, English footballer
1952 – Shaji N. Karun, Indian director and cinematographer
1953 – Gary Johnson, American businessman and politician, 29th Governor of New Mexico
1954 – Bob Menendez, American lawyer and politician
  1954   – Dennis O'Driscoll, Irish poet and critic (d. 2012)
  1954   – Yannis Papathanasiou, Greek engineer and politician, Greek Minister of Finance
1955 – LaMarr Hoyt, American baseball player (d. 2021)
  1955   – Mary Beard, English classicist, academic and presenter
1956 – Sergei Avdeyev, Russian engineer and astronaut
  1956   – Royce Ayliffe, Australian rugby league player
  1956   – Christine Lagarde, French lawyer and politician; Managing Director, International Monetary Fund
  1956   – Martin Plaza, Australian singer-songwriter and guitarist
1957 – Evangelos Venizelos, Greek lawyer and politician, Deputy Prime Minister of Greece
1958 – Grandmaster Flash, Barbadian rapper and DJ 
1959 – Abdul Ahad Mohmand, Afghan colonel, pilot, and astronaut
  1959   – Azali Assoumani, Comorian colonel and politician, President of the Comoros
  1959   – Panagiotis Giannakis, Greek basketball player and coach
1961 – Sam Backo, Australian rugby league player
1962 – Anton Muscatelli, Italian-Scottish economist and academic
1963 – Jean-Marc Gounon, French racing driver
1964 – Dedee Pfeiffer, American actress
1966 – Anna Burke, Australian businesswoman and politician, 28th Speaker of the Australian House of Representatives
  1966   – Ivica Dačić, Serbian journalist and politician, 95th Prime Minister of Serbia
  1966   – Tihomir Orešković, Croatian–Canadian businessman, 11th Prime Minister of Croatia
1967 – Tawera Nikau, New Zealand rugby league player
1968 – Davor Šuker, Croatian footballer
1969 – Morris Chestnut, American actor
  1969   – Verne Troyer, American actor (d. 2018)
1970 – Sergei Kiriakov, Russian footballer and coach
1971 – Bobby Holík, Czech-American ice hockey player and coach
  1971   – Jyotiraditya Madhavrao Scindia, Indian politician
  1971   – Sammie Henson, American wrestler and coach
1972 – Lilian Thuram, French footballer
1974 – Christian Paradis, Canadian lawyer and politician, 9th Canadian Minister of Industry
1975 – Chris Anstey, Australian basketball player and coach
  1975   – Joe Cannon, American soccer player and sportscaster
  1975   – Becky Kellar-Duke, Canadian ice hockey player
  1975   – Fernando Tatís, Dominican baseball player
1979 – Vidya Balan, Indian actress 
1981 – Zsolt Baumgartner, Hungarian racing driver
  1981   – Mladen Petrić, Croatian footballer
1982 – David Nalbandian, Argentinian tennis player
  1982   – Egidio Arévalo Ríos, Uruguayan footballer
1983 – Melaine Walker, Jamaican hurdler
  1983   – Park Sung-hyun, South Korean archer
  1983   – Calum Davenport, English footballer
1984 – Paolo Guerrero, Peruvian footballer
  1984   – Michael Witt, Australian rugby league player
1985 – Steven Davis, Northern Irish footballer
  1985   – Tiago Splitter, Brazilian basketball player
1986 – Pablo Cuevas, Uruguayan tennis player
  1986   – Ramses Barden, American football player
  1986   – Glen Davis, American Basketball player
  1986   – Colin Morgan, Northern Irish actor
1987 – Meryl Davis, American ice dancer
  1987   – Patric Hörnqvist, Swedish ice hockey player
1988 – Marcel Gecov, Czech footballer
  1988   – Dallas Keuchel, American baseball player
1989 – Jason Pierre-Paul, American football player
1990 – Julia Glushko, Israeli tennis player
1991 – Darius Slay, American football player
1991 – Xavier Su'a-Filo, American football player
1992 – Nathaniel Peteru, New Zealand rugby league player
1994 – Brendan Elliot, Australian rugby league player 
1995 – Poppy, American singer and YouTube personality
1997 – Keegan Hipgrave, Australian rugby league player
1998 – Cristina Bucșa, Moldovan-Spanish tennis player
2001 – Angourie Rice, Australian actress
2003 – Daria Trubnikova, Russian rhythmic gymnast

Deaths

Pre-1600
138 – Lucius Aelius, adopted son and intended successor of Hadrian (b. 101)
404 – Telemachus, Christian monk and martyr
 898 – Odo I, Frankish king (b. 860)
 951 – Ramiro II, king of León and Galicia
1031 – William of Volpiano, Italian abbot (b. 962)
1189 – Henry of Marcy, Cistercian abbot (b. c. 1136)
1204 – Haakon III, king of Norway (b. 1182)
1387 – Charles II, king of Navarre (b. 1332)
1496 – Charles d'Orléans, count of Angoulême (b. 1459)
1515 – Louis XII, king of France (b. 1462)
1559 – Christian III, king of Denmark (b. 1503)
1560 – Joachim du Bellay, French poet and critic (b. 1522)

1601–1900
1617 – Hendrik Goltzius, Dutch painter and illustrator (b. 1558)
1697 – Filippo Baldinucci, Florentine historian and author (b. 1625)
1716 – William Wycherley, English playwright and poet (b. 1641)
1748 – Johann Bernoulli, Swiss mathematician and academic (b. 1667)
1780 – Johann Ludwig Krebs, German organist and composer (b. 1713)
1782 – Johann Christian Bach, German composer (b. 1735)
1789 – Fletcher Norton, 1st Baron Grantley, English lawyer and politician, British Speaker of the House of Commons (b. 1716)
1793 – Francesco Guardi, Italian painter and educator (b. 1712)
1817 – Martin Heinrich Klaproth, German chemist and academic (b. 1743)
1846 – John Torrington, English sailor and explorer (b. 1825)
1853 – Gregory Blaxland, Australian farmer and explorer (b. 1778)
1862 – Mikhail Ostrogradsky, Ukrainian mathematician and physicist (b. 1801)
1881 – Louis Auguste Blanqui, French activist (b. 1805)
1892 – Roswell B. Mason, American lawyer and politician, 25th Mayor of Chicago (b. 1805)
1894 – Heinrich Hertz, German physicist and academic (b. 1857)
1896 – Alfred Ely Beach, American publisher and lawyer, created the Beach Pneumatic Transit (b. 1826)

1901–present
1906 – Hugh Nelson, Scottish-Australian farmer and politician, 11th Premier of Queensland (b. 1833)
1918 – William Wilfred Campbell, Canadian poet and author (b. 1858)
1921 – Theobald von Bethmann Hollweg, German lawyer and politician, 5th Chancellor of Germany (b. 1856)
1929 – Mustafa Necati, Turkish civil servant and politician, Turkish Minister of Environment and Urban Planning (b. 1894)
1931 – Martinus Beijerinck, Dutch microbiologist and botanist (b. 1851)
1937 – Bhaktisiddhanta Sarasvati, Indian religious leader, founded the Gaudiya Math (b. 1874)
1940 – Panuganti Lakshminarasimha Rao, Indian author and educator (b. 1865)
1943 – Jenő Rejtő, Hungarian journalist
1944 – Edwin Lutyens, English architect, designed the Castle Drogo and Thiepval Memorial (b. 1869)
  1944   – Charles Turner, Australian cricketer (b. 1862)
1953 – Hank Williams, American singer-songwriter and guitarist (b. 1923)
1954 – Duff Cooper, English politician and diplomat, Chancellor of the Duchy of Lancaster (b. 1890)
  1954   – Leonard Bacon, American poet and critic (b. 1887)
1955 – Arthur C. Parker, American archaeologist and historian (b. 1881)
1960 – Margaret Sullavan, American actress (b. 1909)
1966 – Vincent Auriol, French journalist and politician, 16th President of the French Republic (b. 1884)
1969 – Barton MacLane, American actor, playwright and screenwriter (b. 1902)
1971 – Amphilochius of Pochayiv, Ukrainian saint (b. 1894)
1972 – Maurice Chevalier, French actor and singer (b. 1888)
1978 – Carle Hessay, German-Canadian painter (b. 1911)
1980 – Pietro Nenni, Italian journalist and politician, Italian Minister of Foreign Affairs (b. 1891)
1981 – Hephzibah Menuhin, American-Australian pianist (b. 1920)
1982 – Victor Buono, American actor (b. 1938)
1984 – Alexis Korner, French-English singer-songwriter and guitarist (b. 1928)
1992 – Grace Hopper, American computer scientist and admiral, co-developed COBOL (b. 1906)
1994 – Arthur Porritt, Baron Porritt, New Zealand physician and politician, 11th Governor-General of New Zealand (b. 1900)
  1994   – Cesar Romero, American actor (b. 1907)
  1994   – Edward Arthur Thompson, Irish historian and academic (b. 1914)
1995 – Eugene Wigner, Hungarian-American physicist and mathematician, Nobel Prize laureate (b. 1902)
1996 – Arleigh Burke, American admiral (b. 1901)
  1996   – Arthur Rudolph, German-American engineer (b. 1906)
1997 – Townes Van Zandt, American singer-songwriter, guitarist, and producer (b. 1944)
1998 – Helen Wills, American tennis player and coach (b. 1905)
2001 – Ray Walston, American actor (b. 1914)
2002 – Julia Phillips, American film producer and author (b. 1944)
2003 – Joe Foss, American soldier, pilot, and politician, 20th Governor of South Dakota (b. 1915)
2005 – Shirley Chisholm, American educator and politician (b. 1924)
2006 – Harry Magdoff, American economist and journalist (b. 1913)
2007 – Roland Levinsky, South African-English biochemist and academic (b. 1943)
  2007   – Tillie Olsen, American short story writer (b. 1912)
2008 – Pratap Chandra Chunder, Indian educator and politician (b. 1919) 
2009 – Claiborne Pell, American politician (b. 1918)
2010 – Lhasa de Sela, American-Mexican singer-songwriter (b. 1972)
2012 – Kiro Gligorov, Bulgarian-Macedonian lawyer and politician, 1st President of the Republic of Macedonia (b. 1917)
  2012   – Nay Win Maung, Burmese physician, businessman, and activist (b. 1962)
  2012   – Tommy Mont, American football player and coach (b. 1922)
2013 – Christopher Martin-Jenkins, English journalist (b. 1945)
  2013   – Patti Page, American singer and actress (b. 1927)
2014 – Higashifushimi Kunihide, Japanese monk and educator (b. 1910)
  2014   – William Mgimwa, Tanzanian banker and politician, 13th Tanzanian Minister of Finance (b. 1950)
  2014   – Juanita Moore, American actress (b. 1914)
2015 – Mario Cuomo, American lawyer and politician, 52nd Governor of New York (b. 1932)
  2015   – Donna Douglas, American actress (b. 1932)
  2015   – Omar Karami, Lebanese lawyer and politician, 58th Prime Minister of Lebanon (b. 1934)
  2015   – Boris Morukov, Russian physician and astronaut (b. 1950)
2016 – Fazu Aliyeva, Russian poet and journalist (b. 1932)
  2016   – Dale Bumpers, American soldier, lawyer, and politician, 38th Governor of Arkansas (b. 1925)
  2016   – Vilmos Zsigmond, Hungarian-American cinematographer and producer (b. 1930)
2017 – Tony Atkinson, British economist (b. 1944)
  2017   – Yvon Dupuis, Canadian politician (b. 1926)
  2017   – Derek Parfit, British philosopher (b. 1942)
2018 – Robert Mann, American violinist (b. 1920)
2019 – Paul Neville, Australian politician (b. 1940)
  2019   – Pegi Young, American singer, songwriter, environmentalist, educator and philanthropist (b. 1952) 
2020 – Alexander Frater, British travel writer and journalist (b. 1937)
  2020   – Barry McDonald, Australian rugby union player (b. 1940)
  2020   – David Stern, American lawyer and businessman (b. 1942)
  2020   – Elmira Minita Gordon, Belizean educator and psychologist (b.1930)
2021 – Carlos do Carmo, Portuguese fado singer (b. 1939)
2022 – Dan Reeves, American football player and coach (b. 1944)

Holidays and observances
Christian feast day:
Adalard of Corbie
Basil the Great (Eastern Orthodox Church)
Feast of the Circumcision of Christ 
Feast of the Holy Name of Jesus (Anglican Communion, Lutheran Church)
Feast of Fools (Medieval Europe)
Fulgentius of Ruspe
Giuseppe Maria Tomasi
Solemnity of Mary, Mother of God, the Octave Day of Christmas, considered a holy day of obligation in some countries (Catholic Church); and its related observances:
World Day of Peace 
Telemachus
Zygmunt Gorazdowski
January 1 (Eastern Orthodox liturgics)
Earliest day on which Handsel Monday can fall, while January 7 is the latest; celebrated on the first Monday of the year (Scotland)
Second day of Hogmanay (Scotland) December 31-January 1, in some cases until January 2.
The last day of Kwanzaa (African-Americans) 
The eighth of the Twelve Days of Christmas (Western Christianity)
Constitution Day (Italy)
Dissolution of Czechoslovakia-related observances:
Day of the Establishment of the Slovak Republic (Slovakia)
Restoration Day of the Independent Czech State (Czech Republic)
Emancipation Day (United States)
Euro Day (European Union)
Flag Day (Lithuania) commemorates raising of the Lithuanian flag on Gediminas' Tower in 1919
Founding Day (Taiwan) commemorates the establishment of the Provisional Government in Nanjing
Global Family Day 
Independence Day (Brunei, Cameroon, Haiti, Sudan)
International Nepali Dhoti and Nepali Topi Day
Jump-up Day (Montserrat)
Kalpataru Day (Ramakrishna Movement)
Kamakura Ebisu, January 1–3 (Kamakura, Kanagawa, Japan)
National Bloody Mary Day (United States)
National Tree Planting Day (Tanzania)
New Year's Day (Gregorian calendar)
Japanese New Year
Novy God Day (Russia) 
Sjoogwachi (Okinawa Islands)
Polar Bear Swim Day (Canada and United States)
Public Domain Day (multiple countries) 
Triumph of the Revolution (Cuba)

References

External links

 BBC: On This Day
 
 Historical Events on January 1

Days of the year
January